John William Calhoun (October 24, 1871 Manchester, Tennessee - July 7, 1947 Austin, Texas) was the 11th president of the University of Texas at Austin between 1937 and 1939. Calhoun Hall, a building constructed in 1968 and located on the University of Texas campus, is named after him.

He graduated from University of Texas at Austin and Harvard University.

See also

 History of The University of Texas at Austin
 List of University of Texas at Austin presidents

References

Harvard University alumni
Presidents of the University of Texas at Austin
University of Texas at Austin alumni